The 1988 Virginia Slims of Arizona was a women's  tennis tournament played on outdoor hard courts at The Pointe at South Mountain in Phoenix, Arizona in the United States and was part of the Category 2 tier of the 1988 WTA Tour. It was the third edition of the tournament and was held from September 12 through September 18, 1988. First-seeded Manuela Maleeva won the singles title and earned $17,000 first-prize money.

Finals

Singles

 Manuela Maleeva defeated  Dianne van Rensburg 6–3, 4–6, 6–2
 It was Maleeva's 2nd title of the year and the 12th of her career.

Doubles

 Elise Burgin /  Rosalyn Fairbank defeated  Beth Herr /  Terry Phelps 6–7(6–8), 7–6(7–3), 7–6(10–8)
 It was Burgin's only title of the year and the 9th of her career. It was Fairbank's 2nd title of the year and the 17th of her career.

See also
 1988 Eagle Classic – men's tournament in Scottsdale

References

External links
 ITF tournament edition details
 Tournament draws

Virginia Slims of Arizona
Virginia Slims of Arizona
Virginia Slims of Arizona
Virginia Slims of Arizona